This is a list of schools located in Delhi and affiliated with the Central Board of Secondary Education (CBSE). The schools in Delhi are mostly affiliated to CBSE. But some schools prefer ICSE board.

 Balvantray Mehta Vidya Bhawan ASMA
 Delhi Public School, R. K. Puram
 Don Bosco School (Alaknanda, New Delhi)
 Guru Harkrishan Public School, Nanak Piao
 Hope Hall Foundation School, R. K. Puram
 Lawrence Public School
 Modern School, Barakhamba Road

 Sardar Patel Vidyalaya 
 South Delhi Public School
 St. Mark's Senior Secondary School, Paschim Vihar
 St. Paul's School, New Delhi

 
 Arwachin International School, Dilshad Gardan, Delhi
 Bosco Public School, Paschim Vihar
 Daisy Dales International School, Vikas Puri
 Ganga international school
 Goodley Public School
 Hans Raj Smarak Senior Secondary School, Dilshad Garden
 Lalit Mahajan SVM Sr. Sec.School, Vasant Vihar
 Mount Litera Zee School
 New Bal Vaishali Public School, Sai nagar ext
 New Delhi Public School
 Oxford Senior Secondary School
 Prince Public School, Budh Vihar
 Royal International School, Vikas Puri
 Royal public sr sec school
 St Michael's Sr Sec School
 St. Froebel Senior Secondary School
 St. Giri Public School, Sarita Vihar
 St. Peters Convent, Vikas Puri
 Sumermal Jain Public School
 Tagore Senior Secondary School
 The Adarsh School
 Vasundhara Public School
 Veda Vyasa DAV Public School, Vikaspuri, New Delhi
 Vidya Memorial Public School
 Vishal Bharti Public School

State Government Schools
 G.B.S.S. School No.1, mubarak pur dabas

References

Schools affiliated with CBSE
Schools affiliated with CBSE
Delhi affiliated with CBSE